Triad High School is a high school located in Troy, Illinois. Triad serves the communities of Troy, St. Jacob, and Marine, Illinois, and small portions of Collinsville, Maryville, Glen Carbon, and Highland.

The "Triad" Name 

When the Triad district was formed, a contest was held to decide a name for the school which would serve to the communities. Students in the district had gone to St. Jacob High School, Marine High School, and McCray-Dewey High School of Troy. All three high schools closed down upon the formation of the Triad school district. Vincent Kauhl, a student of McCray-Dewey, submitted the winning entry of "Triad".

History 

Triad High School was originally located in St. Jacob, Illinois from the 1959–60 school year through the 1998–99 school year. Since the school year of 1999–2000, the Triad High School campus has been located in Troy, Illinois. The St. Jacob campus now serves as Triad Middle School, which serves the sixth through eighth grades as a feed-in school to Triad High School.

Athletics 

The Triad High School athletics teams originally competed in the now defunct Midwestern Conference before moving to the South Central Conference. In the 1993–94 school year, Triad moved to the Mississippi Valley Conference (MVC) due to enrollment growth, replacing O'Fallon Township High School. The MVC currently consists of six schools: Bethalto's Civic Memorial High School, Highland High School, Jerseyville's Jersey Community High School, Mascoutah Community High School, Troy's Triad High School, and Waterloo High School. Triad's colors are red, black, and white and their mascot is the Knights. Triad has the following sports programs:

Triad High School has been known to win more Mississippi Valley Conference titles than any other school in the conference since the beginning of the 21st century.

Cheerleading

The Triad varsity cheerleading squad won Illinois Cheerleading Coaches Association (ICCA) state titles in 2001 and 2002 in the Medium Varsity division.  In 2006, they became the first squad to win both state championships (ICCA and IHSA). That was the first year that the Illinois High School Association considered cheerleading a sport.

State championships 

In 1974, senior Fritz Nemsky became Triad High School's first state champion by winning the class "A" heavyweight wrestling championship.

In 2007, junior Erin Wykoff became the school's first female state champion and first state champion in the biggest school division. Her twin sister, Kristin, finished 9th the same year.

In 2011, senior Elizabeth Hampl captured a state championship in shot put.

In 2016, senior Adam Nelson won a state championship in the 100 meter dash. He won the 2A boys title at the IHSA Track and Field finals with a time of 10.72 seconds.

In 2017, the Triad Knights girls' soccer team won the Class 2A State Championship on penalty kicks 5–4

In 2021, the Triad Knights girls' soccer team won the Class 2a State Championship 1-0 in regulation time.

Rivals 
Triad had a rivalry with both Highland High School and Collinsville High School, however recently their main rival has become neighboring Highland High School. Highland usually competes with them in major sporting events such as football and baseball and other activities such as marching band.

Activities 

Triad High School also offers many extra-curricular activities that are not considered sports by the IHSA. Triad sponsors Model U.N., Envirothon, Color Guard, Dance, Scholar Bowl, Band, Chorus, Jazz Band, Robotics, and many other clubs that do not compete interscholastically.

The Triad High School Music Dept. is ranked 8th in the state of Illinois in the Illinois High School Association Sweepstakes.

Envirothon

Triad Envirothon placed first in Illinois state Envirothon competitions in 2000, 2005, and 2007. In those years, the team went on to represent the state of Illinois at the North American Envirothon Competition.

Dance Team

The Triad Varsity Dance Team won the school's first dance State title in 2009 by winning first place at the IDTA State Finals in the AA Pom/Dance category.

The Triad Varsity Dance Team also won the TDI state winning title in the A Kick category and also the IDTA state winning title in the AA kick category in 2011.

References

External links

 Triad Community Unit School District Website accessed February 12, 2009
 Illinois High School Association accessed September 15, 2007
 THS Chorus

Public high schools in Illinois
Schools in Madison County, Illinois